Akyem Kotoku describes a traditional geo-political entity in Eastern Ghana.

Akyen Kotoku is one of the three independent states along with Akyem Bosome and Akyem Abuakwa that  forms the Akyem Mansa. This nation state with a non contiguous land mass exists in the Eastern and Ashanti region of Ghana.

See also
Akan people
List of rulers of the Akan state of Akyem Kotoku
Rulers of Ghana
Gold Coast
Customary law of the akyem kotoku

References

Akyem
Geography of Ghana